Paul T. Anastas  (born May 16, 1962 in Quincy, Massachusetts) is an American scientist, inventor, author, entrepreneur, professor, and public servant. He is the Director of Yale University's Center for Green Chemistry and Green Engineering,  Previously he served as the Science Advisor to the United States Environmental Protection Agency as well as the Agency's Assistant Administrator for Research and Development, appointed by President Barack Obama.

Career 
Anastas is known widely as the "Father of Green Chemistry" for his work on the design and manufacture of chemicals that are non-hazardous and environmentally benign. He is also a champion of sustainability science and innovation for environmental protection.

Anastas has brought worldwide attention to the power of molecular design to help the environment. He has published scores of articles as well as fifteen books, including his seminal work with co-author John Warner, Green Chemistry: Theory and Practice. Their 12 Principles of Green Chemistry are the basis for high school, college and graduate programs around the world and have significantly altered the landscape of the chemicals industry in the United States and other countries.

Anastas began his career as a staff chemist at the EPA, where he coined the term "Green Chemistry" and launched the field's first research program. He went on to co-found the Green Chemistry Institute in 1997 at the American Chemical Society and served in the White House Office of Science and Technology Policy from 1999 to 2004, where he concluded service as Assistant Director for the Environment. Anastas returned to EPA in 2009 as the Assistant Administrator for EPA's Office of Research and Development (ORD) and the Science Advisor to the Agency, resigning from those positions in February 2012 to return to Yale and his family.  In his role as Assistant Administrator, he worked to engage scientists, engineers, and stakeholders across EPA, the federal government, and the scientific community to unify around the common goal of sustainability. He co-founded the chemical manufacturing company, P2 Science in 2011, the catalysis company, Catalytic Innovations in 2017, and Inkemia Green Chemicals in 2017. Anastas is currently the Director of Yale University's Center for Green Chemistry and Green Engineering, where he holds the Theresa and H. John Heinz chair in Chemistry for the Environment.

Early life 
Anastas was born and raised in Quincy, Massachusetts. He developed an interest in science and environmental issues after witnessing the wetlands behind his childhood home get bulldozed and destroyed for a development project. When he was nine years old he received an “Award of Excellence” from President Richard Nixon for his “outstanding achievements in environmental protection” for his essay on the founding of the U.S. Environmental Protection Agency. As a teenager in Quincy, Anastas met and developed a close friendship with fellow green chemist John Warner. The pair have since co-authored several scientific papers and books, including the 12 Principles of Green Chemistry. Anastas retains a noticeable Boston accent and is a devoted fan of his hometown baseball team, the Boston Red Sox.

He is trained as a synthetic organic chemist. He earned his B.S. in chemistry from the University of Massachusetts Boston and his M.A. and Ph.D. in chemistry from Brandeis University.

Press 
Anastas and his work have been featured in several popular media outlets, including:

 Chemical & Engineering News: Paul Anastas and His Crew are Coming to Green Up Your World 
 The New York Times: Green Chemistry Guru Charting New Course at EPA 
 WHYY Radio Times: Paul T. Anastas the Father of Green Chemistry
 Nature: Chemistry: It's Not Easy Being Green 
 Yale Scientific: Paul Anastas: A Power Player in the Global Chemical Industry 
 Living on Earth: Sustainable Science at EPA 
 Market Place: EPA Scientist Advocates Green Chemistry
 Chemical & Engineering News: Mr. Sustainability Goes to Washington

Public speaking 
Anastas is known for delivering energetic, engaging public talks that challenge audience members to think differently about environmental challenges. His speeches have been called "thought provoking", "inspiring", and "optimistic". He has been featured as a keynote speaker at several prestigious meetings, conferences and events, including:

 The American College and University President's Climate Commitment Summit
 The Joseph Priestley Lecture at the Chemical Heritage Foundation
 The United Nations Commission on Sustainable Development Roundtable
 The Albemarle Lecture on Sustainability at Louisiana State University
 The State of Green Business Forum
 The Distinguished Borlaug Lecture at NC State University

Awards 
Anastas has been recognized for his work with several awards, including:
2021: Volvo Environmental Prize 
2018: Honorary Doctorate of Science, University of Massachusetts Boston, USA
2017: US Environmental Protection Agency Lifetime Achievement Award
2017: Italian Chemical Society, Silver Seal Medal
2017: Sigma Xi Distinguished Lecturer
2016: Association of Environmental Engineering and Science Professors, Frontier in Research Award
2016: Royal Society of Chemistry, Green Chemistry Award
2016: Honorary Doctorate of Science in Chemistry, McGill University, Montreal, Canada
2015: Emanuel Merck Lectureship Prize
2012: Wöhler Prize, Gesellschaft Deutscher Chemiker (GDCh)
2012: Edward O. Wilson Biodiversity Technology Pioneer Award
2012: Brandeis University Alumni Achievement Award
2011: The Rachel Carson Environmental Award from the Natural Products Association
 2008: The Annual Leadership in Science Award (with John Warner) from the Council of Scientific Society Presidents
 2007: The John Jeyes Award from the Royal Society of Chemistry
 2006: The 12th Annual Heinz Award for the Environment 
 2005: The Scientific American 50 Award for Policy Innovation 
 2004: The Inaugural Canadian Green Chemistry Award
 2002: The Greek Chemical Society Award for Contributions to Chemistry
2001: Recognized by President George W. Bush for “Distinguished Service on September 11, 2001” noting his “dedicated service to the White House and the Executive Office of the President following the attack on the United States of America” while he was serving in the White House Office of Science and Technology Policy.
 1999: The Nolan Sommer Award for Distinguished Contributions to Chemistry
 1999: The Joseph Seifter Award for Scientific Excellence
 1998: The Vice President's Hammer Award for reinventing government recognizing his work in establishing the U.S. Green Chemistry Program.
1991: President H.W. Bush’s Point-of-Light Award for volunteer service

Anastas was a Special Professor at the University of Nottingham and an Honorary Professor at Queens University of Belfast where he was also awarded an Honorary Doctorate.

References 

21st-century American chemists
Brandeis University alumni
People from Quincy, Massachusetts
Yale University faculty
Yale School of Engineering & Applied Science faculty
Living people
University of Massachusetts Boston alumni
Fellows of the American Chemical Society
People of the United States Environmental Protection Agency
Office of Science and Technology Policy officials
Obama administration personnel
1962 births

External links 
Paul T. Anastas' publication list